() is a city district of Helsinki, in Finland. The name  refers to the Swedish Queen Ulrika Eleonora (1688–1741). During the 19th century the area was dominated by summer pavilions owned by the wealthy Helsinki middle-classes. The appearance of the area changed gradually at the end of the 19th century as the wooden houses were replaced with much higher stone buildings, designed in the prevailing  architectural style synonymous with National Romanticism.

The central part of Ullanlinna is marked by the  park, at the centre of which is the former observatory, designed by Carl Ludvig Engel in 1825 in the Neoclassical style of architecture. Other notable buildings in the district are the Design Museum and the Museum of Finnish Architecture.

Gallery

See also
 Eira
 Kaivopuisto
 Punavuori

Sources

References